Zhuozhou East railway station is a railway station on the Beijing–Guangzhou–Shenzhen–Hong Kong high-speed railway located in Zhuozhou, Hebei, about  away from Beijing West railway station. It opened with the Beijing–Zhengzhou section of the railway on 26 December 2012.

References

Zhuozhou
Railway stations in Hebei
Railway stations in China opened in 2012